Michael McDonald (born c. 1963) is an American costume designer who was nominated for both a Tony Award and a Drama Desk Award in 2009 for his work on the Broadway revival of the musical Hair.

Early life and education
McDonald was born in Allentown, Pennsylvania and is a 1981 graduate of William Allen High School. He attended Muhlenberg College in Allentown, where he took his first costume design course and subsequently worked on several of Muhlenberg's theatrical productions.

Career
In 1984, McDonald became involved in theatre at Allentown's Civic Theatre. 

In the early 1990s, he relocated to New York City, where he worked on productions including The Ride Down Mt. Morgan (Broadway, 2000), The Goat, or Who is Sylvia? (Broadway, 2002) and Take Me Out (Broadway, 2003). In 2009, his work on the Broadway revival of Hair earned him nominations for both the Tony Award for Best Costume Design and the Drama Desk Award for Outstanding Costume Design.

References

External links
 
Michael McDonald credits at Broadway World

1963 births
Living people
American costume designers
Artists from Allentown, Pennsylvania
Muhlenberg College alumni
William Allen High School alumni